The Ceylanpınar incident (22–24 July 2015) saw the killing of two policemen in Ceylanpınar, Turkey, which led to the resumption of the Kurdish-Turkish conflict. The attack was used by the Justice and Development Party (AKP) government as a casus belli to end the otherwise largely successful 2013-2015 solution process and resume its war against the Kurdistan Workers' Party (PKK). As the AKP had failed to win a majority in the June 2015 Turkish general election the month before, and soon after the resumption of hostilities announced the November 2015 Turkish snap general election, analysts believe that the Ceylanpınar killings and return to war have been used to increase Turkish nationalist fervor and favored the ruling party taking back control over the Turkish parliament. Other motives have also been advanced, with the Syrian war encouraging extremist parties from both sides to undermine peace efforts by increasing nationalism and readiness for war.

Background 
Early AKP policies were reformist and appeasing. In 2011, Kurdish independents candidates won 6.6% of the votes and 35 parliament seats while the 2013 Turkey's peace-process greatly reduced PKK activities in South-Eastern Turkey. Lower incomes and lower literacy have been observed for decades in Turkey's South-Eastern provinces, causing higher demographic dynamism and raising political weight for Kurds. On 7 June 2015, following a largely successful ceasefire period thanks to the government and the rebels efforts, the June 2015 Turkish general election provided a major +6.5% gain to the pro-Kurdish Peoples' Democratic Party (HDP) which collected 13.1% of the national votes and a notable decrease for AKP, gathering 41% of votes or a -9% evolution. This electoral success has been called the "Kurdish miracle" and deprived the AKP of its majority previously maintained since 2002. On 20 July 2015, ISIS led the 2015 Suruç bombing, killing 32 Kurdish volunteers. PKK elements accused Turkey of supporting ISIS and being complicit of the bombing. It has been argued that ISIS willfully wanted to put pressure on the Turkey-Kurdish peace process and succeeded in its aim to stir conflict between them.

Incident 
On 22 July 2015, two police officers were assassinated by unidentified men. The officers were killed as they were asleep. Soon after, 9 Turkey Kurds were anonymously denounced as the killers, arrested and accused of assassinations under PKK orders.

Authorship and command 

Authorship was first claimed by PKK's armed wing People's Defence Forces (HPG), describing it as a retaliation following the prior Suruç bombing. The claim suggested PKK-related killers.

The claim was soon countered by higher PKK authorities: a week after, the Kurdistan Communities Union (KCK) spokesman Demhat Agit said that the PKK was not officially involved, saying "these [attack has been led by] units independent from the PKK. They are local forces which organized themselves and not affiliated with us."

Executive reaction 
On 24 July 2015, the Erdogan government simultaneously ordered Turkish Police large scale internal operations while the Turkish military began a large-scale military Operation Martyr Yalçın against the PKK and Islamic State of Iraq and the Levant (ISIL). As a result of attacks by the Turkish army, the PKK officially announced the resumption of full-scale hostilities. The collapse of the ceasefire has been linked to AKP poor performance at the recent June election.

Impact 
On 24 August, President Erdogan of AKP called for a snap election. HDP leadership accused the ruling AKP of orchestrating nationalist attacks against them, HDP volunteers facing a "campaign of lynching" with HDP offices being attacked, in one instance 200 times in 2 days. As fighting intensified, military curfew was imposed in 100 areas in South-Eastern Turkey, most notably in Cizre's 2015 clashes. HDP accused the ruling AK Party of looking to reignite war with PKK and stoke unrest to revive nationalist support ahead of the 1 November election.

On 1 November 2015, the November 2015 Turkish general election provided a major gain to the AKP (49.5% of votes, +8.6%) and decrease for the HDP (10.7% of votes, -2.4%). The HDP narrowly hovered the 10% election threshold needed to win seats. The low score of the HDP has been linked to the renewal of violence and fear of IS attacks on HDP political rallies.

Trial and acquittal of the 9 suspects 
In March 2018, all 9 PKK suspects of the July 2015 killing of the two Turkish policemen in Ceylanpınar, which led AKP to denounce the peace process and resume the conflict, were acquitted by the Turkish Court as no substantial evidence was provided. On 16 April 2019, the 9 suspected PKK operatives' acquittal was upheld by a Higher Court. No suspects have been confirmed for the 22 July 2015's casus belli.

See also 
 2015 Suruç bombing#Ceylanpınar's double assassination
 2015 police raids in Turkey#Kurdish separatists
 Operation Martyr Yalçın#Kurdistan Workers' Party (PKK)
 Kurdish–Turkish conflict (2015–present)
 Kurdish–Turkish conflict (1978–present)

External

References 

2015 in Turkey